Uday Bhembre is an Indian lawyer, Konkani writer and a former member of the Goa Legislative Assembly. He is noted for his role as the editor of the Konkani daily, Sunaparant, and as a Konkani language activist. Bhembre is also widely known as the lyricist of the famed Goan Konkani language song Channeache Rati.

Early life
Uday Bhembre was born in Zambaulim, a village in South Goa. He is the son of eminent freedom fighter Laxmikant Bhembre.

Education
After his early education in Goa, Bhembre went to Bombay (now Mumbai) in 1957 pursuing higher education. Bhembre is an alumnus of Mumbai's Siddharth College. He joined Mumbai's Akashvani (radio broadcaster) centre and became a lyricist. Bhembre is a lawyer by profession.

Activism
Bhembre has been a vociferous advocate for the cause of Konkani language. He played a great role in various movements related to the language.

In the Goa Opinion Poll, Bhembre campaigned against Goa's merger with Maharashtra. At that time, Bhembre authored a column in the popular anti-merger Marathi newspaper Rashtramat. In his column entitled Bhahmastra, Uday Bhembre campaigned for the anti-merger camp and his column played a great role in influencing the Goans in supporting the anti-merger camp.

Bhembre was also a leader of the Konkani language agitation, and he played a great role in the movement which led to the enactment of the Goa, Daman and Diu Official Language Act, 1987. This Act made Konkani as Goa's official language.

Bhembre also played a role in Konkani's inclusion to the Eight Schedule of the Indian Constitution and in granting Sahitya Akademi's recognition to Konkani as an independent language.

Uday Bhembre is a leader of the Bharatiya Bhasha Suraksha Manch (Indian Languages' Protection Organisation- BBSM). This Manch has been set up in Goa to oppose the state government's decision to grant aid to primary schools imparting education in English. Bhembre and the BBSM demand that government grants be allotted to only those educational institutions which provide primary education in the students' mother tongue, i.e., Konkani and Marathi.

Bhembre was also the President of the Konkani Bhasha Mandal.

Books authored
Bhembre neglected creative writing in order to take ahead the Konkani movement at social and organisational level. Bhembre's articles in Rashtramat have been composed into a book entitled Brahmastra (his column in Rashtramat bore the same title). Channyache Rateem, a collection of his poems and songs, has also been published.

Bhembre's Karna Parv (कर्णपर्व) was awarded the Sahitya Akademi Award. He also served as the editor of the now defunct Konkani language newspaper, Sunaparant.

Member of Legislative Assembly
In the 1984 elections to the Goa, Daman and Diu Legislative Assembly, Uday Bhembre was pitched as an independent candidate by the united opposition in Margao, against Indian National Congress party's Anant Narcinva Babu Nayak. Bhembre defeated Nayak and became a member of the legislature. Bhembre played a great role in the framing of the Goa, Daman and Diu Official Language Act, 1987.

Awards and honours
Bhembre was awarded the Kullagar Puraskar (1999), Gundu Sitaram Amonkar Memorial Award (2001), Konkani Bhasha Mandal Patrakarita Puraskar (2008), Bhangrallem Goem Asmitai (2014) Puraskar among others. Uday Bhembre has been honoured with the Sahitya Akademi Award in Konkani language for the year 2015. Bhembre was awarded the prestigious award for his play, Karna Parv (कर्णपर्व).

He has also been appointed the Chair Professor of Poet Bakibab Borkar Chair of Goa University.

References

Living people
Indian newspaper editors
Konkani people
Recipients of the Sahitya Akademi Award in Konkani
Recipients of the Sahitya Akademi Award in English
Journalists from Goa
Konkani-language writers
Goa MLAs 1984–1989
People from Margao
Indian male journalists
20th-century Indian journalists
Independent politicians in India
Year of birth missing (living people)